Minor Detail were an Irish new wave and synthpop band from Blackrock, Dublin, Ireland.

Career
Minor Detail was headed by brothers John and Willie Hughes. Their lyrical themes were positive and covered topics such as romance and peace. Their self-titled debut album was produced by Bill Whelan (later of Riverdance fame), and they became one of the first Irish bands to secure a recording contract with an American label. However, they were short-lived, splitting in 1984, but reunited for a brief period in 1986–87. In 1991, John Hughes would discover the Corr siblings during an audition for The Commitments and would soon become the Corrs' manager.

Discography

Albums
Minor Detail (Polydor POLD 5113, UK 1983)

Singles
"Canvas of Life"/"I'll Always Love You" (Polydor, 1983) IRE #25, US #92
"Canvas of Life"/"Ask the Kids" (Casablanca/Polystar, Japan 1983)
"Canvas of Life"/"Hold On" (Polydor PRD 218?, US 1983)
"Canvas of Life"/"Hold On"/"Take It Again" (Japan)
"Take It Again"/"Living in the 20th Century" (Polydor POSP 679, 1983)
"She's Back"/"Wait" (RCA MD1, IRL 1986)

References

Irish new wave musical groups
Synth-pop new wave musical groups
Musical groups from Dublin (city)
Irish musical duos
Electronic music duos
New wave duos
Sibling musical duos